Harare East is a constituency of the National Assembly of the Parliament of Zimbabwe. Located in Harare, it has been represented since the 2000 election by Tendai Biti. Biti was recalled on 17 March 2021 amid factional disputes within the opposition Movement for Democratic Change Alliance. He was reelected to Parliament as a member of the new Citizens Coalition for Change in a by-election held 26 March 2022.

Members

Election results

References 

Zimbabwe Electoral Commission, Elections to the House of Assembly

Harare
Parliamentary constituencies in Zimbabwe